Titchfield High School is a secondary high school in Port Antonio, Jamaica, in the northern part of Portland Parish. The school was established in January 1786, and is the fifth-oldest high school in the country, after Wolmer's Boys', one of the Wolmer's Schools (1729), Manning's School (1738), St. Jago High School (1744), and Rusea's High School (1777). In the 18th century, these schools originated from their benefactors’ concerns for the education of the country’s poor, usually the children of poor whites, as there was no system in place for the education of the children of slaves.

In 1883, the Jamaica School Commission took over the management of the school from the school's trust. According to the Alumni Association of Titchfield High, South Florida chapter, as of January 2008, there were 99 teachers for 1949 students in grades 7-13.

Titchfield was the first school to win Inter-Secondary Schools Girls Championships back to back, in 1963 and 1964 (its only two titles). In both 2011 and 2012, the school placed second in Television Jamaica's School Challenge Quiz. In 2016, the team which included Demario Asquitt, Zedan Martin, Tajay Edwards and Rajae Chambers and coached by Mr C. Roberts and Mr A. Sparks won the competition, defeating Campion College in the final match. This was the first win by a rural school in almost two decades and also made them only the 13th school to ever win the competition.

The school has six extra-curricular houses named after the school's past principals and/or outstanding benefactors. They are: Brown, Chin, Geddes, Grossett, Plant and Sherlock.

Alumni
 Edward Baugh (born 1936), professor at UWI Mona, poet and scholar
Dr. Kingsley Chin, orthopedic surgeon, Founder and CEO of KICventures Group, university professor and philanthropist 
 Donald J. Harris, economist and father of U.S. Vice President Kamala Harris
 Michael Lee-Chin, OJ (born 1951), billionaire business magnate, investor and philanthropist
 Bryan Sykes (judge), OJ, Chief Justice of Jamaica since 2019
Dever Orgill (born 1990), footballer

References

External links
Titchfield's Facebook page
Alumni Association of Titchfield High, South Florida chapter

High schools in Jamaica
Portland Parish